Cibyra tesselloides is a species of moth of the family Hepialidae. It was described by William Schaus in 1901 and is known from Brazil and Paraguay.

The wingspan is about 62 mm. The forewings are pale brown, the cell and spaces between the veins evenly filled with darker streaks. The hindwings are light reddish brown.

References

External links
Hepialidae genera

Moths described in 1901
Hepialidae